The Amory-Appel Cottage is a historic house on the upland slopes of Mount Monadnock in Dublin, New Hampshire.  Built in 1911 as a garage and chauffeur's house, it was remodeled c. 1954 into a Shingle style summer house.  The building was listed on the National Register of Historic Places in 1985.

Description and history
The Amory-Appel Cottage is located on the grounds of the former Amory country estate, a large tract of land rising on the northern slope of Mount Monadnock between Old Troy Road to the west and the mountain's Pumpelly Ridge to the east.  It is accessed via a private road that snakes across the historic estate.  It stands in a grassy clearing east of the site of the estate's main house (no longer extant).  It is a -story wood-frame structure, with a steeply pitched gabled roof and exterior finished in wooden shingles.  The roof is pierced by small gabled dormers, and a square brick chimney rises above it.  Most windows are small-paned sash.

The cottage was built about 1911 to a design by Charles Goodell of Parsons, Wait & Goodell, originally to serve as a garage and chauffeur's residence for the Amorys.  About 1954, Thomas Handasyd Cabot, a local builder-designer, remodeled it, replacing the original stone chimney with one of brick.  It has elements of Shingle and Arts and Crafts styling reminiscent of the early work of Frank Lloyd Wright.  At the time of its National Register listing in 1985, it was owned by a grandson of Louise Amory, the estate's principal developer.

See also
Amory House
Amory Ballroom
Lattice Cottage
National Register of Historic Places listings in Cheshire County, New Hampshire

References

Houses on the National Register of Historic Places in New Hampshire
Shingle Style architecture in New Hampshire
Colonial Revival architecture in New Hampshire
Houses completed in 1911
Houses in Dublin, New Hampshire
National Register of Historic Places in Dublin, New Hampshire